Beyblade: Shogun Steel, known in Japan as , is a Japanese manga by Takafumi Adachi based on Takara Tomy's Beyblade franchise. It was published between April 2012 and December 2012 in CoroCoro Comic, and serves as the conclusion to the Beyblade Metal Saga. Whereas the previous installments focused on metal parts, the line of Beyblades in Shogun Steel focused on zero gravity battles with the advent of a new stadium system.

Furthermore, this manga was adapted into an anime series that aired on TV Tokyo in Japan from April 8, 2012, to December 23, 2012 and marks the seventh overall anime series in the franchise. This entire series was released on DVD on February 12, 2019, from Cinedigm.

Plot
Seven years have passed since the God of Destruction met his end at the hands of a Legendary Blader. A new era of Beyblade has begun, bringing with it new Blades. When Zyro Kurogane witnessed this final battle with the lord of destruction years ago, a fire began to burn within him to push forward to a new future, while Zyro is the champion in his hometown, he wants to test himself and seek out more significant opponents. Thus, he heads to Metal Bey City, Gingka's hometown. When Zyro arrives and discovers that Gingka is nowhere to be found, he learns that bladers from all over the world have come to test themselves against the Cyclone Bey stadium. Wanting to push his skills to the next level, Zyro takes part in the new era of Beyblade and tests his might against the Cyclone stadium. In this series, Zyro is also guided by Gingka to become a true Blader.

Characters

Zyro is a young boy who saw Gingka's final battle seven years ago and aspired to become a Blader ever since. With his beyblade, Samurai Ifrit, he sets out on a journey to become a great Blader following the same path as Gingka's.

Shinobu is the strongest Blader to be found in Metal Bey City. When Zyro first arrives and learns of this, he instantly becomes Zyro's rival. Shinobu has managed to become the strongest Blader in the city thanks to his beyblade, Ninja Salamander.

A Junior Data Collector and mechanic.

The older brother of Eight. His beyblade is Guardian Leviathan 160SB. It is also necessary to note that he syn-chromed his beyblade with his brother's Pirate Orochi to create Orochi Leviathan.

The younger brother of Kite. His beyblade is Pirate Orochi 145D. He has also offered his beyblade to his brother at times to synchrome and form Orochi Leviathan.

Her beyblade is Thief Phoenix E230GCF.

A beyblade mechanic expert who works at the B-Pit.

The current president of the World Beyblade Battle Association (WBBA).

Blader Gai is the announcer of the tournaments. He has a stylish personality and is very cheerful.

The DNA founder.

A DNA executive.

A DNA executive.

A DNA executive.

A Dark Nebula computer AI rebuilt by DNA, which later revealed itself in A New Fight as the original organizer of the Dark Nebula Association, Doji. He helps Kira acquire Gladiator Bahamoote SP230GF in order for him to become the next ultimate beyblader.

One of the members of DNA and known for his powerful defensive style. His Beyblade is Bandit Golem DF145BS, but is also in possession of Berserker Behemoth SR200BWD after Kira replaced it with Gladiator Bahamoote SP230GF. With Berserker Behemoth, he has synchromed his Golem with it to create Behemoth Golem.

A fearsome and powerful blader who is from DNA. His beyblade was Berserker Behemoth SR200BWD until he replaced it with Gladiator Bahamoote SP230GF. Upon kidnapping Gingka, he steals Pegasus in order to synchrome Pegasus Bahamoote, a very powerful bey.

The third DNA blader. His beyblade is Bandit Genbu F230TB.

The fourth DNA Blader, a dangerous member. His beyblade is Thief Zirago WA130HF.

The fifth DNA blader known as the Blader of Justice. His beyblade is Archer Wyvern 145WB.

The sixth DNA Blader who is also known as Kira’s right-hand man. His beyblade is Berserker Byakko 125S.

The seventh DNA member who convinces everyone that he is able to control the elements of nature. His beyblade is Guardian Garudas SD145PF.

The manager of the restaurant Bull Burger and a teacher at the Bey Park. He trains Zyro throughout the show.

The former No.1 Blader and the strongest legendary blader. Gingka returns to help Zyro unlock his blader's spirit and battles him. He uses Samurai Pegasus W105R²F which evolved from his previous beyblade, Cosmic Pegasus.

A mysterious blader who aims to succeed Ryuga as the next Dragon Emperor. His beyblade is Ronin Dragoon LW160BSF. Sakyo is extremely powerful and almost undefeated through the series.

 

A rival blader to Ren and Zyro, who partners with Sakyo. His bey is Archer Griffin.

A blader disguised as a sea creature, specialized in defense. His beyblade is Pirate Kraken.

A blader that frequently battles in group with henchmen. His bey is Archer Gargoyle.

Episodes

As with previous entries in the franchise, Shogun Steel was localized into English by Nelvana. The series premiered on YTV in Canada and Cartoon Network in the United States on September 17, 2015. It would be the final series to be dubbed by Nelvana. The series started rerunning on Disney XD on January 3, 2021.

References

External links
 
Official TV Tokyo Metal Fight Beyblade Zero-G website 

Beyblade
2012 anime television series debuts
Animated television series about children
Japanese children's animated action television series
Japanese children's animated science fantasy television series
Japanese children's animated sports television series
Shōnen manga
Shogakukan franchises
Takara Tomy franchises
TV Tokyo original programming
Works based on Takara Tomy toys